Distomodontidae is an extinct family of conodonts.

Genera
Genera are:
 †Anticostiodus
 †Distomodus
 †Moskalenkodus

References

External links 

Prioniodontida
Conodont families